"Theme from New York, New York", often abbreviated to just "New York, New York", is the theme song from the Martin Scorsese film New York, New York (1977), composed by John Kander, with lyrics by Fred Ebb. It was written for and performed in the film by Liza Minnelli. It remains one of the best-known songs about New York City. In 2004 it ranked #31 on AFI's 100 Years...100 Songs survey of top tunes in American cinema.

History
Composer John Kander and Lyricist Fred Ebb stated on the A&E Biography episode about Liza Minnelli, that they attribute the song's success to actor Robert De Niro, who rejected their original theme for the film because he thought it was "too weak". The song did not become a popular hit until it was picked up in concert by Frank Sinatra during his performances at Radio City Music Hall in October 1978. 

In 1979, "Theme from New York, New York" was recorded by Frank Sinatra for his album Trilogy: Past Present Future (1980), and became closely associated with him as one of his signature songs. Don Costa received a Grammy nomination for the energetic orchestration. Sinatra occasionally performed the song live with Minnelli as a duet. Sinatra recorded it a second time for his 1993 album Duets, with Tony Bennett.

Sinatra's recording peaked at #32 in June 1980, becoming his final Top 40 hit. It was also an Adult Contemporary hit, reaching #10 in the US and #2 in Canada. The song made a minor showing in the UK (#59); however, it recharted several years later and reached #4 in 1986. The song was nominated for a Grammy Award for Best Pop Vocal Performance, Male and Sinatra made two more studio recordings of the song in 1981 (for his NBC TV special The Man and His Music) and 1993 (for Capitol Records). From the latter, an electronic duet with Tony Bennett was produced for Sinatra's Duets album.

The lyrics of the Sinatra versions differ slightly from Ebb's original lyrics. Notably, the phrase "A-number-one", which does not appear at all in the original lyrics, is sung twice at the song's rallentando climax. (Ebb has said he "didn't even like" Sinatra's use of "A-number-one".) The phrase is both the first and fourth on a list of three superlative titles the singer strives to achieve — "A-number-one, top of the list, king of the hill, A-number-one" — where Ebb's original lyrics (performed by Minnelli) were "king of the hill, head of the list, cream of the crop, and the top of the heap."

The first line of the song is:

The song concludes with the line:

Minnelli's original recording of the song (also used in the Tony Bennett version in Duets) uses the following closing line:

Despite Sinatra's version becoming more familiar, original singer Minnelli had two of the tune's most memorable live performances – during the July 4, 1986 ceremony marking the rededication of the Statue of Liberty after extensive renovations, and in the middle of the seventh inning at Shea Stadium during a New York Mets game, the first pro sports event in the metro area after the September 11, 2001 attacks. She also sang it at Los Angeles Memorial Coliseum during the 1984 Summer Olympics opening ceremony, accompanied by 24 pianos and strobe lights.

Charts
Liza Minnelli version

Frank Sinatra version

Certifications

In popular culture
The song has been embraced as a celebration of New York City, and is often heard at New York City social events, such as weddings and bar mitzvahs. Many sports teams in New York City have played this song in their arenas/stadiums, but the New York Yankees are the most prominent example. It has been played over the loudspeakers at both the original and current Yankee Stadiums at the end of every Yankee home game since July 1980. Originally, Sinatra's version was played after a Yankees win, and the Minnelli version after a loss. However, due to a complaint from Minnelli, the Sinatra version is now heard regardless of the game's outcome.

Liza Minnelli performed it live on September 21, 2001 at Shea Stadium during the seventh inning stretch which was the first game in New York after the attacks on the World Trade Center. The Mets beat the Braves with a dramatic home run by Mike Piazza. It is known as the “9/11 game”.

From the 2005 season until 2020, at the Richmond County Bank Ballpark following Staten Island Yankees games, the Sinatra version was heard regardless of the game's outcome, and was formerly done at Shea Stadium at the end of New York Mets games after the September 11, 2001 attack. Previously, Mets fans felt it was a "Yankee song", and began booing it when it was played. It actually first had snippets of the song played after World Series home runs by Ray Knight and Darryl Strawberry during Game 7 of the 1986 World Series. The song is also sometimes played at New York Knicks games. The Sinatra version is played at the end of every New York Rangers game at Madison Square Garden. It was played at the opening faceoff of Game 7 of the 1994 Stanley Cup Finals at the Garden. The song has also been the post parade song for the Belmont Stakes from 1997 to 2009, and since 2011. Sinatra's version of the song has been played at the end of all four Super Bowls that the New York Giants have won to date, as well as before kickoff of Super Bowl XLVIII, while Minnelli's version was heard after the Giants' Super Bowl XXXV loss.

The song was the musical basis for Jimmy Picker's 1983 three-minute animated short, Sundae in New York, which won the Oscar for Best Short Film (Animated) that year, with a likeness of then-mayor Ed Koch somewhat stumbling through the song, with clay caricatures of New York-based celebrities (including Alfred E. Neuman) and finishing the song with "Basically, I think New York is very therapeutic. Hey, an apple a day is... uh... great for one's constitution!" and burying his face in a big banana split with "THE END" written on his bald head. (Koch used the same rallentando climax Sinatra used, albeit with one big difference: "A-number one, top of the list, king of the hill..." followed by his impression of Groucho Marx completing, "...and incidentally a heckuva nice guy!")

An instrumental version of the song is used as the main theme music for NBC's broadcasts of the Macy's Thanksgiving Day Parade. The Frank Sinatra version is also played during the annual Times Square New Year's Day celebrations, immediately after the first verse of "Auld Lang Syne" and the ball drop that signifies the new year.

Mexico's top singer José José recorded the song in Spanish.

Queen covered the song for the 1986 fantasy film Highlander. Unlike the other songs recorded for the film, it has never appeared on a Queen album.

The song is performed by Brain Gremlin (voice provided by Tony Randall) in the 1990 sequel Gremlins 2: The New Batch.

The song is performed during the end credits "The City of New York vs. Homer Simpson", the first episode of the ninth season of  The Simpsons.

In Arrested Development episode 8 of season 2, which originally aired in January 2005, Tobias, played by David Cross, starts singing the song in his club. Lucille 2, played by Liza Minnelli, is in the audience and remarks "Everyone thinks they're Frank Sinatra."

In DreamWorks Animation's Madagascar (2005), the song is introduced in Central Park Zoo, and Marty later sings the song in the midst of Alex the Lion's delirium.

In the series premiere of the popular CBS crime-drama series Blue Bloods, back in 2010, the song is playing while Jamie is walking out in front of his family while about to graduate from the police academy and when they throw their hats.

In the 2011 film Shame, Sissy Sullivan, played by Carey Mulligan, sings a slower version of this song at a bar.

In 2013, the song was played at the funeral of former New York City Mayor Ed Koch.

The song was also featured in the James Bond film Spectre, during the car chase in Rome, much to Bond's annoyance.

In 2016, the American filmmaker and YouTube personality Casey Neistat published a viral video titled "Snowboarding with the NYPD" which was set to the song.

The song was played thoroughly throughout New York City during the  2020 Coronavirus pandemic in the spring of 2020 by residents expressing pride and solidarity.

The song is regularly played at parties and events to signal the final song of the night.

It is also commonly played at the AESSEAL New York Stadium, home of football team Rotherham United following a win. The stadium is named this due to the land it is built on being an old steel works factory which built the red fire hydrants that characterise New York, USA.

Parodies
 Swedish comedy group Galenskaparna och After Shave made a version of the song in 1985, called "Borås, Borås", about Borås, the mail order center of Sweden.
 Martin Short sang a parody, "North Pole, North Pole", in the 2006 film The Santa Clause 3: The Escape Clause.
 Stephen Colbert sang a parody of the song on the 10 June 2014 episode of The Colbert Report. His version mocked New York Governor Andrew Cuomo's and California Governor Jerry Brown's wager on the result of the Stanley Cup Finals between the New York Rangers and the Los Angeles Kings.
 Professional wrestling team The New Day sang a parody on an episode of WWE Raw the night after they won the Tag Team Championships at SummerSlam in 2015 at the Barclays Center in Brooklyn.
 In concert, Michael Feinstein often sings parody lyrics regarding his hatred of this song.
 Puppet comedy YouTube web series, Glove and Boots recorded a parody of the song in 2015, titled "New York, New York ft Johnny T". Sung by the character Johnny T (a New Yorker frog), the parody is a more cynical take about the modern New York City, with lyrics about gentrification and rising cost of living forcing residents to move out.
 A parody of the song, named "Capital City", is a song from the Simpsons second season episode, "Dancin' Homer", sung by Tony Bennett (who performed the original song as well). The music and lyrics were written by Jeff Martin.
 Jewish song parody group, Rechnitzer Rejects, recorded a version of the song in Yiddish, called Boro Park.

See also

 "I Love L.A." by Randy Newman
 "My Kind of Town", composed by Jimmy Van Heusen and Sammy Cahn
 "I Left My Heart in San Francisco", by Tony Bennett, who also covered "New York, New York" in a duet with Sinatra.
 "Sweet Home Chicago" by Robert Johnson

References

External links
 Present at the Creation (segment of NPR radio show Morning Edition about the song)
 New York New York Lyrics

Film theme songs
1977 songs
1980 singles
Liza Minnelli songs
Frank Sinatra songs
Michael Bolton songs
Michael Ball songs
Songs about New York City
Songs with music by John Kander
Songs with lyrics by Fred Ebb
Traditional pop soundtracks
Songs written for films
New York Yankees
New York Mets
New York Rangers
New York Knicks
Belmont Stakes
United Artists Records singles
Reprise Records singles